Bokkos is a Local Government Area in Plateau State, Nigeria.

It has an area of 1,682 km and a population of 178,454 at the 2006 census. Ron languages are the indigenous languages spoken in Bokkos.

The postal code of the area is 932.

The Plateau State University is located in Bokkos, was suspended in 2007 and reopened in 2012.

 The institution has received accreditation from the National Universities Commission (NUC) Bokkos Local Government major tribes are Ron, Kulere and Mushere.

Bokkos Local Government has eight districts which are Bokkos, Mushere, Daffo, Sha, Manguna, Richard, Toff, and Kamwai. There are 20 electoral wards in Bokkos.

The Paramount ruler of Bokkos is called saf Ron/Kulere. He is the Chairman of the Bokkos traditional council.

Notable people
Notable people from Bokkos include:-

 Joshua Dariye -former State governor

References

Local Government Areas in Plateau State